Dominic Brunetti (born 1977) is an American politician.  He is a Republican former member of the Nevada Assembly, representing District 25 (part of Washoe County). He was appointed to replace Pat Hickey, who resigned.

Biography
Brunetti works as a real estate agent.  He was previously president of the Nevada Homebuilders' Association.

After the 2015 legislative session, prior incumbent Pat Hickey resigned in order to take a position on the Nevada Board of Education.  The seat remained vacant until September 2016, when Brunetti was appointed by the Washoe County Commission for the October 2016 special session.  The session was called in order to authorize the issuance of $750 million in public bonds, so that the money could be given to the Oakland Raiders for the construction of Allegiant Stadium.  Brunetti ultimately voted in favor of the subsidy.

Brunetti did not stand for election in November 2016 and was succeeded by fellow Republican Jill Tolles.

Personal life
Brunetti and his wife, Nina, have three children; Giana, Gemma, and Guy.  Brunetti obtained a BA in political science from Stanford University, and is an avid dancer in his free time.

References

External links
 

1977 births
Living people
Republican Party members of the Nevada Assembly
Politicians from Phoenix, Arizona
Politicians from Reno, Nevada
21st-century American politicians
Stanford University alumni